Emily Ginsburg (born New York, NY) is a conceptual artist who lives in Portland, Oregon. She was selected for the Portland2016 Biennial by curator Michelle Grabner. And her work was noted as a highlight of the Oregon Biennial in 2006. Jennifer Gately, the curator of that Biennial, noted that Ginsburg's work, "reveals a deep interest in the signs and symbols of communication, scientific illustration, architectural notation, electronics, and the human nervous system." Ginsburg's "work often functions as a map or code for understanding an aspect of an individual or collective consciousness."

In 2010, Ginsburg completed Conduit, a public artwork installed on the University Services Building's exterior on the Portland State University campus in Portland, Oregon.Ginsburg's work has been included in books such as Data Flow: Visualizing Information in Graphic Design and The Map as Art, Contemporary Artists Explore Cartography. Ginsburg is a Professor and Chair of Media Arts, teaching in the Intermedia, Printmaking, MFA in Visual Studies, and MFA in Print Media programs at Pacific Northwest College of Art. She holds a Master of Fine Arts in Printmaking from Cranbrook Academy of Art in Bloomfield Hills, Michigan and a Bachelor of Arts in Art History from Trinity College in Hartford, Connecticut.

Career
Ginsburg has been a professor at Pacific Northwest College of Art for 25 years.

Notable solo exhibitions
 Mixed Feelings, Nine Gallery, Portland, Oregon, 2013 
 Busy Signals, Washington State University Gallery, Pullman, Washington, 2009
 Habitual, Fairbanks Gallery, Oregon State University, Corvallis, Oregon, 2008 
 Currents, Seattle Municipal Tower, Percent for Art Commission for Seattle City Light, Seattle, Washington (permanent installation)
 Social Studies, Nine Gallery, Portland, Oregon, 2005
 Slowness, The Art Gym, Marylhurst University, Marylhurst, Oregon, 2002
 Blotto, Manuel Izquierdo Gallery, Portland, Oregon, 2001 
 Wavelength, Studio Art Centers International/Florence, Florence, Italy, 1999 
 Or Current Resident, Metropolitan Center for Public Art, The Portland Building, Portland, Oregon, 1994 
 Whirl, Centrum Gallery, Oregon College of Art and Craft, Portland, Oregon, 1993

Notable group exhibitions
 Portland2016 Biennial, Disjecta, 2016
 Choreograph: Emily Ginsburg and Jane Lackey, The Art Gym, Marylhurst, 2010 
 Oregon Biennial, Portland Art Museum, 2006

Notable collections
 Franklin Furnace Archive at the Museum of Modern Art, New York New York 
 Museo da Gravura de Curitiba, Curitiba, Brazil
 University of Wisconsin, Madison, Wisconsin
 Rhode Island School of Design, Providence Rhode Island
 Gilkey Center for Graphic Arts, Portland Art Museum, Portland, Oregon Printmaking Workshop, New York, New York
 Library of Congress, Washington, D.C.
 Archer M. Huntington Gallery, University of Texas at Austin, Austin, Texas Cranbrook Academy of Art Museum, Bloomfield Hills, Michigan
 Print Club of Albany, Albany, New York
 California State University at Long Beach, Long Beach, California 
 Colgate University Art Museum, Hamilton, New York
 National Academy of Fine Arts, Hang Zhou, China
 City of Portland, Portable Works Collection, Portland, Oregon 
 City of Seattle, Seattle Municipal Tower, Seattle, Washington

References

External links
 Artist's website, (29 Apr 2017)

Living people
Year of birth missing (living people)
21st-century American women artists
American conceptual artists
Women conceptual artists
Pacific Northwest College of Art faculty
Artists from New York City
Artists from Portland, Oregon
Trinity College (Connecticut) alumni
Cranbrook Academy of Art alumni
American women academics